This is a list of estimates of the real gross domestic product  growth rate (not rebased GDP) in Latin American and the Caribbean nations for the latest years recorded in the CIA World Factbook. Nations are not included if their latest growth estimate was for a year prior to 2014. The list contains some non-sovereign territories.

List

See also
Community of Latin American and Caribbean States
List of countries by Human Development Index
List of countries by industrial production growth rate
List of countries by percentage of population living in poverty
List of countries by real GDP growth rate
List of Latin American and Caribbean countries by GDP (nominal)
List of Latin American and Caribbean countries by GDP (PPP)
List of Latin American countries by population

Notes

References

Lists of countries by GDP-based indicators
GDP growth
GDP growth
Latin America and the Caribbean